Mission Robinson is one of the Bolivarian Missions (a series of anti-poverty and social welfare programs) implemented by Hugo Chávez in 2003.

Name 
The name "Robinson" was given to the Mission in remembrance of the Venezuelan philosopher and educator Simón Rodríguez because he adopted the pseudonym Samuel Robinson during his exile from Spanish America.

History 
On May 23 2003, the government implemented a pilot plan in the Capital District and the states of Vargas, Miranda and Aragua. The government considered the pilot a success and followed with Mission Robinson I, a nationwide literacy program, on July 1st.

On September 15 2003, Mission Robinson II was created to continue the education to sixth grade for the first mission's graduates.

The program uses volunteers to teach reading, writing, and arithmetic to Venezuelan adults who are illiterate. The program is military-civilian in nature, and sends soldiers to, among other places, remote and dangerous locales in order to reach the most undereducated, neglected, and marginalized adult citizens to give them regular schooling and lessons. The lessons use the "Yo Sí Puedo" teaching method developed by Dr Leonela Relys Diaz.

Statistics

On the first anniversary of Mission Robinson's establishment, and to an audience of 50,000 formerly illiterate Venezuelans, Hugo Chávez Frías stated in the Teresa Carreño theater in Caracas that “it was truly a world record, in a year we have graduated 1,250,000 Venezuelans". On 28 October 2005, Venezuela declared itself a "Territory Free of Illiteracy". The government claimed that 1,482,000 adults learned to read and write.

According to Francisco Rodríguez of Wesleyan University in Connecticut and Daniel Ortega of IESA, there has been “little evidence” of “statistically distinguishable effect on Venezuelan illiteracy”. The Venezuelan government claimed that it had taught 1.5 million Venezuelans to read, but the study found that "only 1.1m were illiterate to begin with" and that the illiteracy reduction of less than 100,000 can be attributed to adults that were elderly and died. Previous reports had claimed that the eradication of illiteracy had been UNESCO-verified. In October 2006, Venezuelan Education Minister Aristóbulo Istúriz clarified that Venezuela had not received a UNESCO certification because the organisation does not certify literacy programs.

References

External links
 The Robinson Mission Venezuela (unesco.org)
 Misión Robinson – Official government website

Bolivarian missions
Education in Venezuela